Józef Motyka (23 March 1900 in Kąclowa – 6 July 1984 in Lublin) was a Polish botanist and lichenologist.

Education
He obtained his PhD in 1925 at the Jagiellonian University in Krakow for his studies on the ecology of saxicolous lichens (growing on or living among rocks) in Europe.

Early career
Afterwards, he spent several years researching the large lichen genus Usnea, culminating in the publication of a two-volume monograph during 1936–38. During the Second World War he was employed in the Botanical Garden in Lwow. In 1944 he returned to his birthplace, Kąclowa, and began teaching at the Gymnasium in nearby Grybów. A year later Motyka was appointed as Director of the Plant Geography and Systematics department at the Maria Curie-Skłodowska University in Lublin, and soon after became an associate professor. For the next decade he worked largely on the distribution and ecology of vascular plants.

Publications
Returning to work on lichens in the mid-1950s, Motyka studied Poland's lichen flora and published papers on the families Parmeliaceae, Cladoniaceae, Acarosporaceae, Umbilicariaceae, and Thelocarpaceae. He became a full Professor in 1960. He eventually published a total of four textbooks, six monographs, 54 papers, and two general-audience books.

Motyka's draft manuscripts on the lecanoroid lichens were published posthumously in 1995–1996 by his daughter Maria Motyka-Zgłobicka and J. Sieminska, in a four-volume work titled Lecanoraceae. This massive work introduced more than 220 new species, and over 300 new combinations. However, there were several problems in Motyka's text, such as the use of outdated generic concepts, little discussion of why taxonomic decisions were made, and omissions of important information for many of the newly described species. For these reasons, Helge Thorsten Lumbsch and colleagues made a formal proposal to consider this work opera utique oppressa—a suppressed work that is not taxonomically valid.

Recognition
Motyka was awarded the Polonia Restituta and Golden Cross of Merit for his academic work.

Eponymous species
Several lichens have been named in honor of Józef Motyka:
Alectoria motykae D.Hawksw.
Alectoria motykana Bystrek
Ramalina motykana Bystrek
Usnea motykae Räsänen
Usnea motykana Bystrek & Wójciak

See also
 :Category:Taxa named by Józef Motyka

References

1900 births
1984 deaths
Jagiellonian University alumni
People from Nowy Sącz County
20th-century Polish botanists
Polish lichenologists